China Gate is a 1998 Indian Hindi-language Western action film directed by Rajkumar Santoshi. It was released on 27 November 1998.
China Gate follows the basic storyline of the classic Seven Samurai. The film was critically acclaimed for Santoshi's writing and direction. The song "Chamma Chamma" picturised on Urmila Matondkar became a chart buster and was used in Baz Luhrmann's film Moulin Rouge!. The film won Filmfare Award for Best Dialogue.

Plot
The story begins with Col. Krishnakant Puri and his ten men who were dishonorably discharged from the Indian Army for failing in the China Gate mission. They belong to the "Ghatak" platoon of an infantry regiment. Krishnakant lives an alienated life after the Court-martial. Frustrated, one day he is about to commit suicide when a young lady named Sandhya knocks on his door.

Having witnessed the brutal slaying of her Forest Officer father, Sunder Rajan, at the hands of dreaded dacoit Jageera, Sandhya goes to the Col. and asks for his assistance in bringing an end to Jageera's rule in the Devdurg region. Col. Krishnakant agrees to assist her and summons ten of his fellow officers and subordinates to assist him in this mission. They assemble at Devdurg with the necessary ammunition and arms to combat Jageera, not realizing that Jageera has influence over the local police detachment, who will prevent Krishnakant and his men to possess any guns and weapons. This does not deter the men, and they continue to stay on in Devdurg. They gain the confidence of the villagers too.

The villagers do not know that Krishnakant and his men had been dishonorably discharged from the army for cowardice. At the time of the first encounter with the gang of Jageera, the team of Krishnakant realised that they are out of shape and have lost instincts and fighting capabilities due to age. With the permission of Col. Krishnakant, Major Gurung starts to train them again.

One day, Jageera captures them with the help of corrupt police officer Barot, but they escape finally and in turn capture Jageera. Col Krishan Puri and few officers intend to kill him, but leader Col. Puri hands him over to the police inspector Barot. As a result, Jageera is again set free and kills Maj. Sarfaraj.

Now the full team of Col. Krishnakant along with the villagers chase Jageera to take final revenge. They Teach Inspector Baarot an Ultimate lesson. Krishnakant gets to know that Sandhya and rest of the residents are held hostage by Jageera. Udit is able to save her. After the Deadly fight, The Five soldiers including Kewal kills Jageera only to avenge Sarfaraz's death.

The film ends with the full team setting out for next adventure to accomplish the new Mission afterwards Udit becomes Sandhya's husband.

Cast 

 Om Puri... Colonel Krishnakant Puri (Regiment of Artillery)
 Amrish Puri... Colonel Keval Krishan Puri (Grenadiers)
 Naseeruddin Shah... Major Sarfaraz Khan (Gorkha Rifles)
 Danny Denzongpa... Major Ranjit Singh Gurung (Sharpshooter)
 Samir Soni... Udit "Uditanshu" Tandon
 Kulbhushan Kharbanda... Major Kulbhushan Gupta (Planner)
 Tinu Anand... Captain Bijon Dasgupta (Batchmate of Major Gurung from NDA) (Explosive Expert) (Corps of Engineers)
 Viju Khote... Nb Subedar Ghanshyam (Regiment of Artillery) (Gunner)
 Jagdeep... Havaldar Ramaiyah
 Anjan Srivastav... Havaldar Dharti Kumar Pandey
 Mukesh Tiwari... Jageera
 Paresh Rawal... Inspector Baarot 
 Ila Arun... Gopinath's wife
 Shivaji Satam... Gopinath (Village Sarpanch)
 Razak Khan... Sadhuram (Lali's Uncle)
 Anupam Kher... Brigadier Anoop Kumar / Governor (Special Appearance)
 Girish Karnad... Forest Officer Sundar Rajan (Sandhya's Dad, Special appearance)
 Rahul Singh
 Mamta Kulkarni... Sandhya
 Benaf Dadachandji... Lali
Harish Patel...Local Villager
Shreechand Makhija...Local Villager
 Urmila Matondkar in a special appearance in the song "Chamma Chamma"

Production
The film was conceived as a tribute to Akira Kurosawa's Seven Samurai. The film was made on the budget of 20 crores, the most expensive Bollywood production at that point of time.

Soundtrack
The music for this movie was composed by Anu Malik and the item song "Chamma Chamma" became extremely popular, which was later used in Hollywood film Moulin Rouge! and was recreated for the film, Fraud Saiyyan.

References

External links 
 

1998 films
Films directed by Rajkumar Santoshi
1990s Hindi-language films
Films scored by Anu Malik
1998 Western (genre) films
Indian Western (genre) films
Fictional portrayals of police departments in India
Indian remakes of Japanese films
Indian films about revenge